The 2018 World Cup of Golf (known as the 2018 ISPS Handa Melbourne World Cup of Golf for sponsorship reasons) was a golf tournament that was played from 22 to 25 November at Metropolitan Golf Club in South Oakleigh, Victoria, Australia. It was the 59th World Cup. The format is 72-hole stroke play; the first and third days were four-ball (best ball), and the second and fourth days were foursomes (alternate shot) play.

The Belgian pair of Thomas Pieters and Thomas Detry won with a score of 265, 23-under-par. Australia and Mexico tied for second place, three strokes behind. It was Belgium's first  victory in the World Cup.

Qualification
The 28 nations to compete were determined based on the top-ranked player from each country from the Official World Golf Ranking as of 3 September 2018.

These 28 seeded players selected a partner from the same country ranked in the top 500 of the OWGR. If there were less than five possible choices in the top 500, the seeded player could choose any of the next five players from that country in the rankings, even if they were ranked outside the top 500. The deadline for teams to be finalized was 20 September.

Teams
The table below lists the teams in order of qualification (i.e. ranking of seeded player on 3 September 2018) together with their World Rankings at the time of the tournament.

The following players were eligible to be a seeded player but did not commit. The order is based on the World Rankings on 3 September 2018. Five countries with an eligible player did not compete: Argentina, Austria, Chinese Taipei, Chile and Paraguay (withdrew as alternate). They were replaced by Zimbabwe, Malaysia, Wales and Greece.

  Dustin Johnson
  Brooks Koepka
  Justin Thomas
  Justin Rose
  Jon Rahm
  Francesco Molinari
  Bryson DeChambeau
  Rory McIlroy
  Rickie Fowler
  Jordan Spieth
  Jason Day
  Tommy Fleetwood
  Bubba Watson
  Patrick Reed
  Alex Norén
  Paul Casey
  Tony Finau
  Hideki Matsuyama
  Webb Simpson
  Xander Schauffele
  Henrik Stenson
  Patrick Cantlay
  Phil Mickelson
  Tiger Woods
  Rafa Cabrera-Bello
  Sergio García
  Louis Oosthuizen
  Branden Grace
  Emiliano Grillo
  Charl Schwartzel
  Bernd Wiesberger
  Shubhankar Sharma
  Pan Cheng-tsung
  Joaquín Niemann
  Fabrizio Zanotti

Final leaderboard
Australia, England and South Korea tied for the lead after the first day fourball rounds with 10-under-par rounds of 62. Conditions were difficult for the second day foursomes with rain and gusty winds. Belgium and South Korea led after day 2 on 10-under-par. Mexico had the best round of the day, 70, to lift themselves into 7th place while hosts Australia had a disappointing round of 76 and dropped into a tie for 8th place. On the third day Belgium had their second fourball round of 63 and took a 5-stroke lead, ahead of Italy, Mexico and South Korea. On the final day Australia set the clubhouse lead on 268 after a final round 65. Belgium came to the last with a two-stroke lead. Thomas Pieters put their second shot to four feet, which Thomas Detry holed to give Belgium a three-stroke victory with a final round of 68. Mexico tied with Australia for second place.

Rounds 1 and 3 were four-ball (best ball), rounds 2 and 4 were foursomes (alternate shot). Prize money is for the pair.

Notes and references

External links

World Cup (men's golf)
Golf tournaments in Australia
Sports competitions in Melbourne
World Cup golf
World Cup golf
World Cup golf